Sleep Warm is an album recorded by Dean Martin for Capitol Records in three sessions between October 13, 1958 and October 15, 1958 with arrangements by Pete King and orchestra conducted by Frank Sinatra.  Described in the liner notes as a "beguiling set of lullabies for moderns," the selections follow a "bedtime" concept with several of the song titles containing the words "dream" and/or "sleep."

The completed album was released March 2, 1959. In 1965 Capitol Records re-released an 11-track version of Sleep Warm under the title Dean Martin Sings/Sinatra Conducts.

Track listing

LP
Capitol Records Catalog Number (S) T-1150

Side A
1. "Sleep Warm" (Lew Spence, Marilyn Keith, Alan Bergman) – 3:51
Session 7333; Master 30400. Recorded October 14, 1958.
2. "Hit the Road to Dreamland" (Harold Arlen, Johnny Mercer) – 2:51
Session 7266; Master 30150. Recorded October 15, 1958.
3. "Dream" (Johnny Mercer) – 3:20
Session 7322; Master 30354. Recorded October 13, 1958.
4. "Cuddle Up a Little Closer" (Karl Hoschna, Otto Harbach) – 3:12
Session 7322; Master 30357. Recorded October 13, 1958.
5. "Sleepy Time Gal" (Ange Lorenzo, Richard A. Whiting, Joseph R. Alden, Raymond B. Egan) – 2:51
Session 7266; Master 30147. Recorded October 15, 1958.
6. "Good Night Sweetheart" (Ray Noble, Jimmy Campbell, Reg Connelly) – 3:10.
Session 7322; Master 30356. Recorded October 13, 1958.

Side B
1."All I Do Is Dream of You" (Nacio Herb Brown, Arthur Freed) – 2:46
Session 7266; Master 30149. Recorded October 15, 1958.
2."Let's Put Out the Lights (And Go To Sleep)" (Herman Hupfeld) – 2:45
Session 7333; Master 30401. Recorded October 14, 1958.
3."Dream a Little Dream of Me" (Wilbur Schwandt, Fabian Andre, Gus Kahn) – 3:16
Session 7322; Master 30355. Recorded October 13, 1958.
4."Wrap Your Trouble in Dreams (And Dream Your Troubles Away)" (Ted Koehler, Harry Barris, Billy Moll) – 2:59
Session 7266; Master 30148. Recorded October 15, 1958.
5."Goodnight, My Love" (Mack Gordon, Harry Revel) – 3:03
Session 7333; Master 30403. Recorded October 14, 1958.
6."Brahms' Lullaby" (Public Domain) – 3:00
Session 7333; Master 30402. Recorded October 14, 1958.

Compact Disc

Ed. 1996 
Capitol Compact Disc Catalog Number 7243 8 37500 2 3

Ed. 2005 
Collectors' Choice Music reissue added four more tracks to the twelve tracks on the original Capitol LP. Catalog Number WWCCM06022.
1. "The Sailor's Polka" (Jerry Livingston, Mack David)
Session 2309; Master 9020-6. Recorded September 15, 1951.
2. "Humdinger" (Edna Lewis, Irving Fields)
Session 7757; Master 31691-11. Recorded May 15, 1959.
3. "Baby Obey Me" (Jay Livingston, Ray Evans)
Session 1726; Master 5923-3. Recorded April 28, 1950.
4. "Zing-A Zing-A-Boom" (Black-Out e Ze Maria, Glen Moore)
Session 1646; Master 5605-4. Recorded March 3, 1950.

Personnel
Dean Martin: Vocals.
Frank Sinatra: Conductor.
Pete King: Arranger
Benjamin Barrett: Contractor.
Alfred Viola: Guitar.
Joseph G. 'Joe' Comfort: Bass.
Alvin A Stoller: Drums (Sessions 7322 and 7333).
William Richmond: Drums (Session 7266).
Ken Lane: Piano.
William Miller: Piano.
Elizabeth Greensporn: Cello.
Edgar 'Ed' Lustgarten: Cello (Session 7322).
Kurt Reher: Cello (Session 7333).
Eleanor Aller Slatkin (Session 7266).
Kathryn Julye: Harp (Sessions 7322 and 7266).
Stella Castellucci: Harp (Session 7333).
Alvin Dinkin: Viola (Sessions 7322 and 7266).
Louis Kievman: Viola (Session 7322).
Alexander Neiman: Viola (Session 7333).
Paul Robyn: Viola (Session 7333 and 7266).
Victor Arno: Violin.
Harry Bluestone: Violin (Session 7322).
Jacques Gasselin: Violin (Session 7322).
James Getzoff: Violin (Session 7333).
Seymour Kramer: Violin (Session 7322).
Carl LaMagna: Violin (Session 7322).
Daniel 'Dan' Lube: Violin.
Amerigo Marino: Violin.
Alexander 'Alex' Murray: Violin (Session 7333).
Erno Neufeld: Violin (Session 7333).
Louis Raderman: Violin (Session 7266).
Paul C. Shure: Violin.
Felix Slatkin: Violin (Session 7266).
Marshall Sosson: Violin (Session 7266).
Gerald Vinci: Violin (Sessions 7333 and 7266).
Jack Cave: French Horn (Sessions 7322 and 7333).
Gus Bivona: Saxophone (Session 7266).
Herman C. Gunkler: Saxophone (Sessions 7322 and 7333).
Dale Issenhuth: Saxophone.
Jules Jacob: Saxophone.
Abraham E. Most: Saxophone.
Theodore M. 'Ted' Nash: Saxophone (Sessions 7322 and 7333).
Wilbur Schwartz: Saxophone (Session 7266).
Frances L. 'Joe' Howard: Trombone (Session 7266).
Murray McEachern: Trombone (Session 7266).
George M. Roberts: Bass trombone (Session 7266).
Frank F. Beach: Trumpet (Session 7266).
Conrad Gozzo: Trumpet (Session 7266).
Dale McMickle: Trumpet (Session 7266).
Edwin L 'Buddy' Cole: Piano.
Julian C. 'Matty' Matlock: Clarinet.
Charles T. 'Chuck' Gentry: Saxophone.
Edward R. Miller: Saxophone.
Elmer R. 'Moe' Schneider: Trombone.
Charles Richard 'Dick' Cathcart: Trumpet.

Notes

Dean Martin albums
1959 albums
Capitol Records albums
Albums conducted by Frank Sinatra
Concept albums